The James O'Connor-John Trybowski Three-Decker is a historic triple decker in Worcester, Massachusetts.  When the building was listed on the National Register of Historic Places in 1990, it was recognized for its well preserved Colonial Revival styling, including porches supported by heavy square columns, and decorative brackets on the cornice.  It was built about 1914, and its first owner, James O'Connor, was a gasfitter, and its early tenants were Irish immigrants.  Since its listing, the house's exterior has been resided, removing the cornice decorations and enclosing the porches (see photo).

See also
National Register of Historic Places listings in southwestern Worcester, Massachusetts
National Register of Historic Places listings in Worcester County, Massachusetts

References

Apartment buildings on the National Register of Historic Places in Massachusetts
Colonial Revival architecture in Massachusetts
Houses completed in 1914
Apartment buildings in Worcester, Massachusetts
National Register of Historic Places in Worcester, Massachusetts